Caroline Hagström (born 1964) is a Swedish Christian Democrat politician and sports coach.

References

1964 births
Living people
Members of the Riksdag from the Christian Democrats (Sweden)
Women members of the Riksdag
Members of the Riksdag 1998–2002
21st-century Swedish women politicians